Coombe is a hamlet in northeast Cornwall, England, United Kingdom.

Combe is situated in the civil parish of Morwenstow three miles (5 km) north of Bude. Most houses in the settlement are owned by the Landmark Trust.

Combe lies within the Cornwall Area of Outstanding Natural Beauty (AONB). Almost a third of Cornwall has AONB designation, with the same status and protection as a National Park.

Coombe Mill
Coombe Mill, a disused mill built on four levels, lies at the bottom of Coombe Valley. It is a Site of Special Scientific Interest, noted for its various species of bat that inhabit the mill's buildings.

References

External links

Hamlets in Cornwall
Populated coastal places in Cornwall
Sites of Special Scientific Interest in Cornwall
Sites of Special Scientific Interest notified in 2000
Morwenstow